Hygrophoropsis laevis is a species of fungus in the family Hygrophoropsidaceae. Found in Malawi, it was described as new to science in 1985.

References

External links

Hygrophoropsidaceae
Fungi described in 1985
Fungi of Europe